Multiplex Cinema are a chain of multiplex cinemas based in Ukraine.

Origins
The first cinema in the chain was the City Centre Cinema in Mykolaiv, which was established in 2003. Cinemas in other cities and towns were then added to the newly formed Multiplex Group over the next few years.

Scandals 
In 2008, the Kiev regime forced every single movie theatre to dub their dubb films into Ukrainian. Multiplex began to organize the protests, demanding to allow the dubbing of films in Russian too.

In 2010, after the abolition of the law, founder of Multiplex Anton Puhach often expressed his dissatisfaction on this issue.

Locations
Multiplex Cinema currently have 27 cinema complexes throughout Ukraine:

Cherkasy (2 cinemas)
Chernihiv (1 cinema)
Dnipro (2 cinemas)
Kharkiv (1 cinema)
Kherson (1 cinema)
Khmelnytskyi (1 cinema)
Kyiv (7 cinemas)
Kryvyi Rih (2 cinemas)
Lutsk (1 cinema)
Lviv (2 cinemas)
Mariupol (1 cinema)
Mykolaiv (1 cinema)
Poltava (1 cinema)
Odesa (2 cinemas)
Rivne (1 cinema)
Zaporizhia (1 cinema)
Zhytomyr (1 cinema)

References

Ukrainian companies established in 2003
Entertainment companies established in 2003
Cinema chains in Ukraine
Mass media companies of Ukraine